Manucy is a surname. Notable people with the surname include:

Albert Manucy (1910–1997), American writer and historian
Dominic Manucy (1828–1885), American Roman Catholic bishop